Rosthwaite is a settlement in the English Lake District.

For local government purposes Rosthwaite forms part of the civil parish of Broughton West, the district of South Lakeland, and the county of Cumbria. It is within the Westmorland and Lonsdale constituency of the United Kingdom Parliament. Prior to Brexit in 2020 it was part of the North West England constituency of the European Parliament.

References

Hamlets in Cumbria
South Lakeland District